The 1940–41 Southern Football League was the first edition of the regional war-time football league tournament.

Table

Results

References
 Scottish Football History – Southern Football league

season
1
Scot